Vernon Leroy Maxwell (born October 25, 1961) is a former American college and professional football player who was a linebacker in the National Football League (NFL) for seven seasons during the 1980s.  Maxwell played college football for Arizona State University, and was selected as an All-American.  He played professionally for the Baltimore/Indianapolis Colts, Detroit Lions and Seattle Seahawks, and was recognized as the NFL Defensive Rookie of the Year.

Maxwell was born in Birmingham, Alabama.

External links
Photo
ASU Announces Hall of Fame Choices for 1997

1961 births
Living people
Players of American football from Birmingham, Alabama
American football linebackers
Arizona State Sun Devils football players
All-American college football players
Baltimore Colts players
National Football League Defensive Rookie of the Year Award winners
Detroit Lions players
Seattle Seahawks players